Paralamium is a genus of flowering plant in the family Lamiaceae, first described in 1913. It contains only one known species, Paralamium griffithii, native to Yunnan, Assam, Arunachal Pradesh, northern Myanmar, and northern Vietnam.

References

Lamiaceae
Flora of Asia
Monotypic Lamiaceae genera